Caribbean Cops is an 8 part documentary created for Virgin 1.

The series was shot on location in Jamaica, Trinidad and Tobago, and St Lucia, and was designed to capture the drama behind policing these holiday destinations and keeping the islands safe.

Throughout the series, cameras followed each of the islands' local police forces in their battles against international drug smuggling, gun crime and homicide, as well as other crimes directly linked with the tourist trade. The series is narrated by English actor Shaun Parkes.
Series Producer: Tricia O'Leary

See also
Brit Cops
Road Wars
Police Interceptors
Traffic Cops
COPS

References

External links
Schedule on TruTV in the United States

2008 British television series debuts
2008 British television series endings
2000s British documentary television series
British crime television series
Documentary television series about policing
English-language television shows
Channel One (British and Irish TV channel) original programming
Sky UK original programming